Agosta is a  (municipality) in the Metropolitan City of Rome in the Italian region of Latium, located about  east of Rome.

Located on a tuff rock in the Monti Simbruini area, Agosta borders the following municipalities: Canterano, Cervara di Roma, Marano Equo, Rocca Canterano, Subiaco.

History
The area of Agosta was inhabited since prehistoric times. It is mentioned in Augustus's Res Gestae as the source of the Aqua Marcia aqueduct, and after that it took its name from the Roman emperor. In 1051 AD a castle is mentioned here, which later was a possession of the monastery of Subiaco.

Main sights
Medieval castle
Arch of the Cardinal o della Porta, built in 1503 near a bridge which at the time crossed the Aniene river.
Sanctuary of Madonna del Passo (17th century)

References

External links
 Official website

Cities and towns in Lazio